Zalka or Zalqa, part of Zalka - Amaret Chalhoub municipality, is a city with a population around 27000 located in the Matn District of the Mount Lebanon Governorate in Lebanon. The main thoroughfare, Zalka Souq, is filled with boutique clothing stores and surrounded by a mix of residential high-rises and old stone mansions. Another popular street is Michel el Murr Avenue, busy with joggers and dog walkers.

References

External links
Zalqa - Aamaret Chalhoub, localiban

Populated places in the Matn District